The Auckland Open could refer to:

WTA Auckland Open, women's tennis tournament
ATP Auckland Open, men's tennis tournament
Auckland Open (darts), annual darts tournament